Henry Nicoll (October 23, 1812 – November 28, 1879) was an American lawyer and politician who served one term as a United States representative from New York from 1847 to 1849.

Biography 
Born in New York City (NYC), he graduated from Columbia College in 1830. He studied law, was admitted to the bar in 1835 and commenced practice in New York City.

Political career 
He was a delegate to the New York constitutional convention in 1847, and was elected as a Democrat to the Thirtieth Congress, holding office from March 4, 1847 to March 3, 1849.

Later career and death 
He resumed the practice of law and in 1879 died in New York City. Interment was in the family burying ground in Mastic.

References

1812 births
1879 deaths
Columbia College (New York) alumni
Democratic Party members of the United States House of Representatives from New York (state)
People from Mastic, New York
19th-century American politicians